The  Expiatory Chapel in Monza is a monument-chapel built to atone and commemorate the site at which the king Humbert I was murdered on July 29, 1900, by the anarchist Gaetano Bresci. It stands near the entrance to the Royal Villa of Monza on Viale Regina Margherita and Via Matteo da Campione. Humbert's son Vittorio Emanuele III commissioned the aged architect Giuseppe Sacconi, and the work was completed by his pupil Guido Cirilli, and completed in 1910. Obelisk-like crosses emerge from a stone chapel, and are surmounted by bronze crown and royal symbols of the House of Savoy. The entrance is surmounted by a Pieta by the sculptor Lodovico Pogliaghi.

There is another such expiatory chapel to atone for a regicide, the Chapelle expiatoire in Paris, built to atone for the execution of Louis XVI.

Sources 
	Information from Italian Wikipedia entry
	Italy including Leghorn, Florence, Ravenna and routes through France, Switzerland, and Austria: handbook for travellers by Karl Baedeker, page 194.

Buildings and structures in Monza
Roman Catholic churches completed in 1910
20th-century Roman Catholic church buildings in Italy